HMS Waterwitch was one of only three armoured gunboats built for the Royal Navy.  Uniquely she was powered by Ruthven's "hydraulic propeller", making her the first ship to employ waterjets.  She was launched in 1866 and conducted comparative trials with her two sister ships. She was not employed operationally and was sold in 1890.

Design
While Viper and Vixen were twin screw vessels, Waterwitch had a water-pump propulsion system. Vixen was almost identical to Viper, but was of composite construction.

Hull
Waterwitch was an armoured gunboat of the breastwork type, with a hull constructed of iron.
The forward and aft ends of the box were similarly armoured, although the front end also extended upwards by a further . In addition, a waterline armoured belt extended for the whole length of the vessel. She and her two sisters were the only armoured gunboats ever built for the Royal Navy. Unlike her sisters, she was fitted with a bow rudder as well as the traditional stern rudder.

Sail plan
She was equipped with a barquentine rig.

Armament
Waterwitch was armed with two 7-inch (6½-ton) muzzle-loading rifled guns and two 20-pounder breech-loading rifled guns.

Propulsion
Waterwitchs unique propulsion system was essentially a vast centrifugal steam-powered pump which drew water from sluices in the centre of the vessel and ejected it in jets from adjustable nozzles. Two sets of nozzles were provided, one for ahead propulsion and one for astern propulsion. Steam was provided by two Maudslay iron fire-tube boilers fed from six furnaces. The wheel was rotated by three steam cylinders and developed . The hopes of safety, performance and control that were expected from this propulsion were summed up by Mr M W Ruthven:

Construction
Waterwitch was ordered from the Thames Ironworks and Shipbuilding Company on 29 October 1864 and laid down the same year.  She was launched on 28 June 1866 and commissioned on 26 June 1867 under Commander Philip Ruffle Sharpe for comparative trials.

Career

Vixen, Viper and Waterwitch conducted comparative trials at Stokes Bay in the Solent the late 1860s. She was inspected by the American admiral commanding the European Squadron, Admiral David Farragut in 1867.

None of the armoured gunboats performed well in the trials because of their inefficient hull form.  Waterwitch was no worse than Viper or Vixen in the speed trials and manoeuvred impressively.  Nevertheless, a huge internal volume was required for the internal "hydraulic propeller" and there was little in favour of this early form of jetboat over the then nearly ubiquitous screw propulsion.

She carried out inclining tests in Keyham Basin, Devonport on 16 March 1871. She seems to have spent much of the rest of her life as a test bed alongside in Portsmouth.

Fate
Placed on the non-effective list long before disposal, she was sold to Castle for breaking at Charlton on 26 April 1890.

References

 
 
 

 

Gunboats of the Royal Navy
Victorian-era gunboats of the United Kingdom
Ships built in Leamouth
1866 ships